Dabra is one of the 230 Vidhan Sabha (Legislative Assembly) constituencies of Madhya Pradesh state in central India. It is a segment of Gwalior Lok Sabha constituency. This constituency is reserved for the candidates belonging to the Scheduled castes.

Overview
Dabra (constituency number 19) is one of the 6 Vidhan Sabha constituencies located in Gwalior district. Presently, after the delimitation of the legislative assembly constituencies in 2008, this constituency covers the entire Dabra tehsil of the district. Before the delimitation, it covered the erstwhile Bhitarwar and Dabra R.I. Circles of the erstwhile Dabra tehsil.

It is a segment of Gwalior Lok Sabha constituency.

Members of the Legislative Assembly

Election Results

2020 by-poll
 Suresh Raje (Cong) : 75,030 votes
 Imarti Devi (BJP) : 67,462

2018 Vidhan Sabha Election
 Smt. Imarti Devi (INC) : 90,598 votes
 Kaptan Singh (BJP) : 33,152  
 Pratap Singh Mandeliya (BSP) : 13,155

2013 results

2008 Vidhan Sabha Election
 Smt. Imarti Devi (INC) : 29,134 votes
 Hargovind Jauhari (BSP) : 18,504

1962 Elections
 Brinda Sahai (INC) : 12,695 votes
 Jagannath Singh (IND) : 10,562

See also
 Dabra
 Gwalior district
 List of constituencies of the Madhya Pradesh Legislative Assembly

References

Gwalior district
Assembly constituencies of Madhya Pradesh